The Prince and the Pagoda Boy is a 2010 Vietnamese historical drama film directed by Lưu Trọng Ninh. The film recounts the life of Ly Cong Uan from his youth as a Buddhist disciple to his ascension to Emperor of Vietnam in 1010 AD. The Prince and the Pagoda Boy was released in 2010 to mark the 1000th anniversary of the city of Thang Long (today's Ha Noi).

The film was selected as the Vietnamese entry for the Best Foreign Language Film at the 84th Academy Awards, but it did not make the final shortlist.

See also
 List of submissions to the 84th Academy Awards for Best Foreign Language Film
 List of Vietnamese submissions for the Academy Award for Best Foreign Language Film

References

External links
 

2010 films
2010s historical drama films
2010 drama films
Vietnamese-language films
Vietnamese historical drama films
Films set in the Lý dynasty